Events in the year 1963 in Spain.

Incumbents
Caudillo: Francisco Franco

Births
May 3 - Jordi Ribera.
August 11 - Natalia Más.

Deaths

 January 13 – Ramón Gómez de la Serna, Spanish writer (b. 1888)
 November 5 – Luis Cernuda, Spanish poet (b. 1902)
 November 19 – Carmen Amaya, Spanish dancer (b. 1918)

See also
 List of Spanish films of 1963

References

 
Years of the 20th century in Spain
1960s in Spain
Spain
Spain